Seung-yeon, also spelled 
Seung-yun, or Seung-yon, Sung-yeon, Sung-yon, is a Korean unisex given name. The meaning differs based on the hanja used to write each syllable of the name. There are 17 hanja with the reading "seung" and 56 hanja with the reading "yeon" on the South Korean government's official list of hanja which may be registered for use in given names.

People
People with this name include:

Kim Seung-yeon (born 1952), South Korean businessman
Choi Seung-youn (born 1964), South Korean female speed skater
Lee Seung-yeon (born 1968), South Korean actress
Lee Seung-yeon (born 1977), South Korean actress
Woo Seung-yeon (1983–2009), South Korean model and actress
Han Seung-yeon (born 1988), South Korean singer and actress, former member of girl group Kara
Hong Seung-yeon (born 1992), South Korean female tennis player
Gong Seung-yeon (born Yoo Seung-yeon, 1993), South Korean actress
Son Seung-yeon (born 1993), South Korean female singer
Cho Seung-youn (born 1996), South Korean singer, member of boy groups Uniq and X1

See also
List of Korean given names

References

Korean unisex given names